Beaver Dam State Park may refer to:

Beaver Dam State Park (Illinois), U.S.
Beaver Dam State Park (Nevada), U.S.
Beaver Dam State Forest, a New York State Forest, U.S.

See also
Beaver Creek State Park, Ohio, U.S.
Beaver Lake State Park (North Dakota)